The Črnuče District, or simply Črnuče, is a district of the City Municipality of Ljubljana in the northern part of Ljubljana, the capital of Slovenia. It is named after the former town of Črnuče.

Geography
The Črnuče District is bounded on the south by the Sava River, on the west by a line east of Spodnje Gameljne and Rašica; on the north by a line south of Trzin and Dragomelj; and on the east by a line just east of the A1 Freeway. The district includes the former settlements of Brod, Črnuče, Dobrava pri Črnučah, Gmajna, Ježa, Nadgorica, Podgorica pri Črnučah, and Šentjakob ob Savi. It is part of the traditional region of Upper Carniola and is now included with the rest of the municipality in the Central Slovenia Statistical Region.

References

External links

Črnuče District on Geopedia
Črnuče District homepage

 
Districts of Ljubljana